Vladimir Solodukhin (born 8 April 1969) is a retired Russian professional footballer and a coach. Since 2010, he works as a youth coach at his hometown club Dynamo Bryansk.

Honours
Dnepr-Transmash Mogilev
Belarusian Premier League champion: 1998

References

External links 
 Profile at teams.by
 

1969 births
Living people
Russian footballers
Russian expatriate footballers
Expatriate footballers in Belarus
FC Dynamo Bryansk players
FC Dnepr Mogilev players
Belarusian Premier League players
Association football forwards
FC Mashuk-KMV Pyatigorsk players
Sportspeople from Bryansk